Hope in Heaven is a documentary that examines the Philippines sex trade and the young women and children it trafficks.
It was part of a five-year development project funded by the Canadian International Development Agency (CIDA) in cooperation with Mount Saint Vincent University (MSVU) and Saint Mary's University, of Halifax, Nova Scotia, Canada.

Plot
Hope in Heaven, by filmmaker Meredith Ralston, examines the Philippines brutal sex trade and the young women and children it enslaves.
Seen through the eyes of two idealistic female students and a male university professor, the film captures two years of Mila's life and the people who befriend her, the poverty and squalor she lives of Angeles City she lives in.
The documentary depicts the social hygiene clinic in Angeles where hundreds of young women and children line up daily for health checks in primitive conditions.
Interviews with prostitutes, mama-sans, community workers, academics and clients expose the complexity of prostitution in two very different cultures.
The documentary also shows live footage of seventeen children (some as young as ten years old) are rescued from a local brothel in Angeles and caught disturbingly on film.

Funding
Hope in Heaven was part of a five-year development project funded by the Canadian International Development Agency (CIDA) in cooperation with Mount Saint Vincent University (MSVU) and Saint Mary's University, of Halifax, Nova Scotia, Canada.

Profits
All profits from the documentary were donated to the Women Helping Women Center in Angeles City, and to Mila, who suffers from tuberculosis.

Produced in association with
 The Canadian International Development Agency
 CIDA-AUCC TIER 2 UPCD Programme
 Mount Saint Vincent University
 MSVU Technology Learning and Research Centre
 Saint Mary's University
 SMU International Activities Office

Meredith Ralston
The documentary was written, directed and produced by Meredith Ralston.
Ralston is a professor in the women's studies and political studies Departments at Mount Saint Vincent University and president of Ralston Productions Ltd. in Halifax where she lives.
She is a graduate of the UCLA School of Theater, Film and Television.
Ralston is a Fredericton High School graduate who studied political science at the University of New Brunswick before earning her degree at the University of Toronto.

The book
Ralston published her book dealing with this as Reluctant Bedfellows in 2008.

Narration
Narrated by Kiefer Sutherland.

Awards
Hope In Heaven (Selling Sex in Heaven) won Best Documentary at the Big Bear Lake International Film Festival in California.
It was also featured at the Atlantic Film Festival in September 2005.

References

External links
 Official website

Documentary films about prostitution
Crime in the Philippines
Films about prostitution in the Philippines